Jose Cortes Altavas (September 11, 1877 – August 21, 1952) was a Filipino politician, legislator and man of letters. He was a municipal councilman of Capiz (present day Roxas City, Capiz), provincial board member (1906–1907), congressman (1907–1909 and 1925–1927), governor of Capiz (1910–1916), senator (1916 to 1922), and 1934 Constitutional Convention delegate.

Early life and education 
Born on September 11, 1877, Jose Altavas was from the town of Balete of the province of Capiz, Philippines. His parents, Jose Altavas Sr. and Andrea Cortes, sent him to Ateneo de Manila for school and later at the University of Santo Tomas for his law degree. His studies were disrupted by the Philippine Revolution of which he had an active involvement in his hometown under the command of Santiago Bellosillo. He was 20 years old at that time.

When the revolution ended, he finished his studies and practiced law in Capiz on May 6, 1901, after passing the bar. He was also a newspaperman and writer who wrote Spanish poems and a 54-volume memoir that contained recollections of his life.

Politics 
Altavas began his political career as an elected member of the Capiz (present day Roxas City) municipal council in 1903 and later as provincial board member from 1906 until 1907. From 1907 to 1909, he was voted as a legislator to the First Philippine Legislature for the 2nd district of the province. In 1910, he became governor of Capiz and served until 1916. It was during his term that the construction of the provincial capitol building, bridges, and roads between Aklan and Capiz began.

From 1916 to 1922, Altavas was elected senator during the Fourth Philippine Legislature and the Fifth Philippine Legislature, representing the 7th senatorial district that was composed of the provinces of Capiz, Iloilo and Romblon. By 1925, he again won as 2nd district representative, and his term ended in 1927. He was also voted to be the 1st district delegate to the 1934 Constitutional Assembly.

Personal life 

Altavas was married to Socorro Barrios Laserna and had seven children. On August 21, 1952, he died in Roxas City, Capiz.

A historical marker was installed by the National Historical Commission of the Philippines in his memory at the entrance of the Altavas municipal hall, and his bust can be found at the park outside the building.

References 

1952 deaths

Members of the House of Representatives of the Philippines from Capiz

University of Santo Tomas alumni

1877 births
Governors of Capiz
Ateneo de Manila University alumni
20th-century Filipino lawyers
Members of the Philippine Legislature

Senators of the 4th Philippine Legislature
Senators of the 5th Philippine Legislature
Provincial board members in the Philippines
Filipino city and municipal councilors